Skokie Public Library has been serving the community of Skokie, Illinois, since 1930.

History 
The library was first organized in July 1929 by the Cosmos Club of Niles Center, one of two Woman’s Clubs in Niles Center at the time. The library first opened its doors in February 1930 in rented rooms at the corner of Oakton Street and Lincoln Avenue. It operated on book donations and volunteer staff. The library was open for 10 hours a week and had a materials collection of 1,000 books. In 1941, voters approved a tax-supported library which brought Skokie Public Library, formerly the Niles Center Free Public Library, reliable funding.

In April 1933, the library re-opened in remodeled space in the Municipal Building with a collection of 3,000 volumes and 900 borrower’s cards. The library was still funded by fundraising and donations at the time, but in 1934, the Village gave the library a small appropriation to the Cosmos Club to hire a part-time librarian. The first full-time librarian was hired in 1937.

In March 1942, the library re-opened at 4913 Oakton Street. The building was divided in half with the other half occupied by the United States Post Office. The library expanded to fill the entire building when the United States Post Office moved to a new location in 1952.

It wasn’t until 1960 that the library got its permanent home at 5215 Oakton Street, right across from Village Hall. The building was designed by Gertrude Lempp Kerbis of Skidmore, Owings, and Merrill. In 1971, a building expansion, designed by architecture firm Hammond & Roesch, expanded the building’s footprint to the east and added a second floor to the library. In 2003, another major renovation designed by Robert D. Hunter of O'Donnell, Wicklund, Pigozzi & Peterson brought the third floor. In 2021, the library completed a three-year interior renovation project, which modernized the first and second floors. 

In 2020, Skokie Public Library went fine free.

Branches 
Skokie Public Library’s main branch is located in downtown Skokie. Its mobile branch, the bookmobile, had its first ride in 1957. The bookmobile originally traveled to 8 destinations in Skokie; it has since expanded to 16 stops. The artwork on the bookmobile is by local artist, Jay Ryan. 

In 2019, the library welcomed a book bike. It has traveled to different community events and local parks throughout the summer.

Awards and Recognition 
The library has received numerous awards and special recognition throughout the years. The library has received a five-star ranking from Library Journal and was the first public library in Illinois to be awarded the National Medal for Museum and Library Service in 2008. 

In 1960, the library won the Chicago Municipal Art League award for excellence in architecture. In 1963, the library was the recipient of the American Institute of Architects and the American Librarian Association First Honor Award for Library Buildings.

In 1982, Skokie Public Library was depicted in a cachet by Skokie artist Doris Gold for the “Libraries of America” commemorative postage stamp issued by the U.S. Postal Service.

Special Features 
Our spaces have been recently updated to meet our community’s needs. 

Kids Room

Natural light floods the space on three sides, with improved access to the updated outdoor courtyard for games, water fun, and nature play. The new Storytime Room is bright, cheerful, and flexible. The Activity Room is open for drop-in crafts and registered events. There is also a Sensory Break Room for anyone who needs a calm environment to get away. There are family bathrooms, a private place to feed babies, and stroller parking.

Teen Room

The Teen Room is a safe and welcoming space for 6th-12th graders in the Skokie community to hang out with friends, use a study room, play games, make things, and just be. Library staff is on hand at all times to provide support, help guide activities, and connect teens to library resources and collections. 

Courtyards

In good weather, patrons can take a book outside and sit on the reading patio and enjoy a snack outside the café space. Little ones enjoy play-friendly flooring and open space for Nature Play, oversized games, and water play. 

Study Rooms

Skokie Public Library has study rooms on the second floor for adult patrons, in the Teen Room, and in the Kids Room. 

Makerspaces

The Studio is the makerspace located on the second floor. The Studio brings hands-on learning and creative exploration to adults and teens in our community. Three Studio suites offer spaces, software, and equipment for digital media production. 

The BOOMbox on the first floor offers opportunities for hands-on learning for kids around all kinds of topics. There is also a sink so that things can get messy.

Auditorium

The Petty Auditorium is often used for performances, movies, and presentations for audiences of about 150 people.

Exhibits

The library exhibits a variety of solo and group shows and informational and interactive displays near the library’s east entrance.

References

Libraries in Cook County, Illinois
1929 establishments in Illinois
Libraries established in 1929
Skokie, Illinois